Frank Adams (born November 7, 1970) is a former Canadian football cornerback who played in the Canadian Football League. After briefly practicing with the BC Lions in the offseason, Adams was signed by the Toronto Argonauts for the 1995 season. He went on to play in three regular season games for the Argonauts, recording 16 tackles.

References 

1970 births
American football cornerbacks
Canadian football defensive backs
South Carolina Gamecocks football players
BC Lions players
Toronto Argonauts players
Players of Canadian football from North Carolina
Players of American football from North Carolina
Living people
People from Gastonia, North Carolina